Dinhing Dapita Sadya is the weekly entertainment show of the ABS-CBN Davao Entertainment Group and its hosted by Id Acaylar, Onnie Alfaro & Ian Garcia.

The show signed off as it gave way to MagTV Na Sadya Ta! (later MAG TV Na, MAG Negosyo Ta! and renamed since 2017 as MagTV Na! Southern Mindanao) in 2008 as part of the same brand regional talk or magazine shows.

Segments
Onnie 911
Luwag ni Ian
Misyon Makeover
Dabaw Dyoks Squad

See also
DXAS-TV
ABS-CBN Regional Network Group

Television in Davao City
ABS-CBN Regional shows
2005 Philippine television series debuts
2008 Philippine television series endings